Kameničany is a village and municipality in Ilava District in the Trenčín Region of north-western Slovakia.

History
In historical records the village was first mentioned in 1193.

Geography
The municipality lies at an altitude of 233 metres and covers an area of 5.082 km². It has a population of about 466 people.

Genealogical resources

The records for genealogical research are available at the state archive "Statny Archiv in 
Bratislava, Bytca, Slovakia"

 Roman Catholic church records (births/marriages/deaths): 1700-1896 (parish B)
 Lutheran church records (births/marriages/deaths): 1783-1895 (parish B)

See also
 List of municipalities and towns in Slovakia

References

External links
 Official page
Surnames of living people in Kamenicany

Villages and municipalities in Ilava District